Abışabad (also, Abyshabad, Abushabad, and Abush-Abad) is a village and municipality in the Jalilabad Rayon of Azerbaijan.  It has a population of 1,124.

References

External links
Satellite map at Maplandia.com 

Populated places in Jalilabad District (Azerbaijan)